Parastathes is a genus of longhorn beetles of the subfamily Lamiinae.

subgenus Antennastathes
 Parastathes apicalis (Aurivillius, 1925)

subgenus Parastathes
 Parastathes basalis (Gahan, 1907)
 Parastathes flavicans (Gahan, 1907)
 Parastathes moultoni (Aurivillius, 1914)

References

Astathini
Cerambycidae genera